Statistics of Austrian league in the 1946–47 season.

Overview
It was contested by 11 teams, and SC Wacker won the championship.

League standings

Results

References
Austria - List of final tables (RSSSF)

Austrian Football Bundesliga seasons
Austria
Football